Linda Marinda Heywood (born 1945) is an American historian and professor of African American studies and history at Boston University.

Heywood has a BA from Brooklyn College and a PhD from Columbia University. In 2008, she shared the Herskovits Prize for her book (co-authored with her husband John Thornton) Central Africans, Atlantic Creoles, and the Foundation of the Americas, 1585-1660.  She was elected to the American Academy of Arts and Sciences in 2020.

Selected publications
 Contested Power in Angola, 1840s to the Present. University of Rochester Press, Rochester, 2000.  
 Central Africans and Cultural Transformations in the American Diaspora. Cambridge University Press, 2001. (editor and contributor) 
 Central African, Atlantic Creoles, and the Foundation of America 1585-1660. Cambridge University Press, 2007. (with John Thornton) 
 Njinga of Angola: Africa’s Warrior Queen. Harvard University Press, 2017.

References 

1945 births
Living people
20th-century African-American women
21st-century African-American writers
21st-century American historians
21st-century American women writers
African-American academics
African-American women academics
American women academics
African-American women writers
American women historians
Boston University faculty
Brooklyn College alumni
Columbia University alumni
Historians of Africa
Historians of the United States